The 1930–31 Swiss National Ice Hockey Championship was the 21st edition of the national ice hockey championship in Switzerland. HC Davos won the championship by defeating Lycée Jaccard in the final.

First round

Eastern Series 
HC Davos qualified for the final.

Western Series 
Lycée Jaccard qualified for the final.

Final 
 HC Davos - Lycée Jaccard 10:0

External links 
Swiss Ice Hockey Federation – All-time results

Nat
Swiss National Ice Hockey Championship seasons